The A52 autoroute is a 25.3 km long motorway in the Bouches du Rhone departement of southeastern France. The road  links the A8 autoroute with the A50 autoroute and runs from a junction 1 km east of the Péage de La Barque on the A8 to near the town of Aubagne where it meets the A50. It is a toll road except for the very southern stretch south of the Péage du Pont d'Etoile and is operated by ESCOTA. Traffic information for the road is covered by Radio Vinci Autoroutes (FM107.7). It is a mixture of 2x2 and 2x3 lane road, with recent construction work to widen some of the 2x2 lane sections (2018).

The A52 effectively provides a bypass of the city of Marseille, enabling those travelling between Toulon/Hyeres and Aix-en-Provence and Lyon to avoid travelling through the city.

When travelling southbound from Aix-en-Provence to Toulon, one must take the exit slip after the Péage du Pont d'Etoile in order to remain on the A52. This anomaly is a result of the construction history of the motorway.

History of the A52

In 1962, an autoroute named the A52 was constructed between Marseille and Auriol in order to offer a fast link part of the way between Marseille and Nice.  The southern section of the current road, then known as the East Motorway, was constructed and designated A52 in 1963, the original section subsequently to be known as the western end of the A50 autoroute and the A501. The A50 section between Marseille and what is now the A501 was extended eastwards to link up with the new A52 and onward in stages to Toulon by 1975. The northern section of the A52 was subsequently  constructed, joining up with the A8 autoroute creating both a link between Marseille and Nice on the one hand and between Aix-en-Provence and Toulon on the other.

On the A8 at  Saint-Maximin-la-Sainte-Baume, a ramp was constructed with a view to continuing what is now the A520 from Auriol to the A8 and linking Marseille to the A8 in the direction of Nice more directly by motorway. This idea was eventually abandoned in favour of a series of developments  of the D560 and in view of the construction of the A57 autoroute which provides a similar link, albeit via Toulon.

The original A52 was finally renumbered in 1982 with four different designations, only the section between the north of Aubagne and Roquevaire having kept its original number: A50 between Marseille and Aubagne, A501 north-west of Aubagne and A520 (designated first A53 then A521) to Auriol at the exit on the D560.

Junctions

Exchange A52-A8 Junction with the A8
Service Area: Peypin/de Baume de Marron
33 (Pas de Trets) Towns served: La Bouilladisse
Exchange A52-A520 Junction with A520 spur to D560 to Auriol and Brignoles
Péage de Pont de l'Etoile
34 (Pont de l'Etoile) Towns served: Aubagne
Exchange A52-A501 Junction with A501 spur to Marseille
35 (Aubagne-est) Towns served: Aubagne
Exchange A52-A50 Junction with A50 (eastbound) to Toulon.

References

External links

 A52 Motorway in Saratlas

A52